Continental Experience is a studio album by British jazz pianist George Shearing, billed as part of the 'George Shearing Quintet and Amigos'.

Track listing 
 "Lullaby of Birdland" (George Shearing, George David Weiss) – 3:08
 "When Your Lover Has Gone" (Einar Aaron Swan) – 2:55
 "To a Wild Rose" (Edward MacDowell) – 3:07
 "I'll Be Around" (Alec Wilder) – 2:36
 "Thine Alone" (Victor Herbert, Henry Blossom) – 2:53
 "Don't Blame Me" (Jimmy McHugh, Dorothy Fields) – 5:27
 "The Continental" (Herb Magidson, Con Conrad) – 3:10
 "The Nearness of You" (Hoagy Carmichael, Ned Washington) – 3:00
 "Roses of Picardy" (Frederick Weatherly, Haydn Wood) – 2:53
 "Someone to Watch Over Me" (George Gershwin, Ira Gershwin) – 2:33
 "East of the Sun (and West of the Moon)" (Brooks Bowman) – 3:25
 "We'll Be Together Again" (Carl Fischer, Frankie Laine) – 1:55

References 

1975 albums
George Shearing albums
MPS Records albums